A braderie or jaarmarkt (respectively meaning roasting and annual market in Dutch) is a type of grand yearly street fair and street market found in the Netherlands, Belgium, Luxembourg and Northern France, mostly held in the summer months.

There, nearly all towns and large villages have their own braderie and, especially in villages, they often are one of the key social events.

Typically, the local vendors put up stands outside of their shops in which they will sell their goods at a reduced price. This basic set up is often accompanied by outside traders, various food stands, a flea market, craftsmen making traditional tools, art or footwear (such as wooden shoes), live music (often provided by a local boerenkapel), street theater and people in traditional garments.

One of the most famous Braderies in Europe, is the annual Braderie de Lille, France.  Its gathers millions of visitors.

See also

References

Dutch culture
Belgian culture
Luxembourgian culture